Frongoch internment camp at Frongoch in Merionethshire, Wales was a makeshift place of imprisonment during the First World War and the 1916 Easter Rising.

History

1916 the camp housed German prisoners of war in a yellow distillery and crude huts, but in the wake of the 1916 Easter Rising in Dublin, Ireland, the German prisoners were moved and it was used as an internment camp for approximately 1,800 Irish republicans, among them such notables as Michael Collins, who were accorded the status of prisoners of war. Among the prisoners were the future Hollywood actor Arthur Shields and sportsman and referee Tom Burke. It is a common misconception that Éamon de Valera was also imprisoned at Frongoch.

The Irish Republican internees elected their own commandants (this practice was followed in future imprisonments/internments) and established a chain of command. The camp became a breeding ground for the guerillas of the Irish rebels, with inspired organisers such as Michael Collins giving impromptu lessons in guerrilla tactics. Later the camp became known as ollscoil na réabhlóide, the "University of Revolution".

Lord Decies was appointed as Chief Press Censor for Ireland after the Rising in 1916, and he warned the press to be careful about what they published. William O'Brien's Cork Free Press was one of the first papers he suppressed under the Defence of the Realm Act 1914 (DORA regulations) after its republican editor, Frank Gallagher, accused the British authorities of lying about the conditions and treatment of republican prisoners at the camp.

The camp was emptied in late December 1916 when David Lloyd George replaced H. H. Asquith as Prime Minister. The local Welsh medium school, Ysgol Bro Tryweryn, now stands on the site of the internment camp, but a commemorative plaque stands nearby, with inscriptions in Irish, Welsh and English.

In 2016, the hundredth anniversary of the internment of Irish prisoners at Frongoch, the local community organized a number of commemoration events and the history of the camp was widely reported.

List of notable internees involved in the Easter Rising

This list is not complete.

Denny Barry
Gerald Boland
Tom Burke
Michael Carolan
Joe Clarke
Harry Colley
Con Collins
Michael Collins
W. T. Cosgrave
Philip Cosgrave
Paddy Daly
P. T. Daly
Henry Dixon
Dick Fitzgerald
Thomas Hand
John MacDonagh
Tom McEllistrim
Seán McGarry
Patrick McGrath
Dick McKee
Seán McLoughlin
Seán Mac Mahon
Patrick Moran
James Nowlan
Seán Nunan
J. J. O'Connell
Batt O'Connor
Joseph O'Connor
Joseph O'Doherty
Brian O'Higgins
Patrick O'Keeffe
Seán O'Mahony
Cathal Ó Murchadha
Liam Ó Rinn
Gearóid O'Sullivan
Kit Poole
Séumas Robinson 
Arthur Shields
Michael Staines
Thomas Traynor

Bibliography
 Brennan-Whitmore, W, With the Irish in Frongoch (Dublin 1918; republished 2013)
 Ebenezer, Lyn, Fron-Goch and the birth of the IRA (London 2006)

Notes

External links
 Frongoch, Wales - a unique place in Irish history - a website in English, Welsh and Irish dedicated to the history of Frongoch camp, including a list of Irish prisoners’ names.

Llandderfel
History of Merionethshire
Prisons in Gwynedd
Gwynedd
Temporary populated places in the United Kingdom
World War I sites in the United Kingdom
Easter Rising
World War I internment camps
World War I prisoner-of-war camps
Wales in World War I
Internment camps of the British Empire
Internment camps in the United Kingdom